The Tudor Arms Apartments are a historic building in Portland, Oregon, United States. The five-story building was completed in 1915. It has been on the National Register of Historic Places since 1994.

The nineteenth-century Tudor Revival/Jacobethan style architecture was designed by noted Portland architect Carl L. Linde. The exterior is brick with decorative white glazed terra cotta lintels.  An archway bearing the building's name marks the entrance into a landscaped courtyard. The leaded glass entry opens into a grand foyer paneled with mahogany wainscoting and underscored with marble flooring.  Individual apartments have hardwood floors and original mill work.

Located in Northwest or Nob Hill District, an area zoned for historic preservation, adjacent to the Pearl District and Downtown Portland, the building was converted to condominiums in 2006. In order to maintain its historical status most of its original features have been preserved.

Gallery

See also
Architecture in Portland, Oregon
National Register of Historic Places listings in Northwest Portland, Oregon

References

Residential buildings completed in 1915
Apartment buildings on the National Register of Historic Places in Portland, Oregon
1915 establishments in Oregon
Carl L. Linde buildings
Northwest Portland, Oregon